Terry Dexter is the debut studio album by American contemporary R&B singer Terry Dexter. It was released by Warner Bros. Records on July 13, 1999 in the United States. The album did not chart on the US Billboard 200, but it peaked at number 49 on the Top R&B/Hip-Hop Albums chart. Three singles were released from the album: "You'll Never Miss Me ('Til I'm Gone)", "Better Than Me" and "Strayed Away". "Better Than Me" is Dexter's only song to date to chart on the US Billboard Hot 100, peaking at number 99 in 1999.

Critical reception

AllMusic editor William Ruhlmann wrote: "Eight different producers contribute [...] and they successfully give Dexter a contemporary R&B sound that apes much of what other singers of her ilk are wailing over. And she wails competently, but no more so than any other youthful Mariah Carey wannabe on the market."

Track listing

Notes
 denotes a co-producer

Sample credits
"Yeah" contains elements of "Rapture" (1981) as performed by Blondie.

Charts

Release history

References

External links
 
 

1999 debut albums
Terry Dexter albums
Warner Records albums